Dornick may refer to

 Dornick is cited in the Oxford English Dictionary as a dialectal US term originating in the mid-19th century, meaning "pebble, stone or small boulder"
 Dornick (cloth), a strong linen damask used for table cloth
 Dörnick,  a municipality in the district of Plön, in Schleswig-Holstein, Germany
 Dornick Hills Group, a geologic group in Oklahoma. 
 Dornick Hills Golf & Country Club
Gaal Dornick